Indian empires rose to power following the birth of Buddhism, Jainism and Hinduism in the Indian subcontinent. The period of the Gupta Empire under Samudragupta is sometimes attributed to as the Golden Age of India.

List
The following list enumerates Hindu empires and dynasties in chronological order.

Note: Kingdoms that acted as princely states to the British Empire are not mentioned except for the time period when they exercised sovereign control.

See also 
 Bhagavad Gita
 Hindu cosmology
 History of India
 History of Hinduism
 Yoga & Ayurveda
 Vedas & Vedic Literature
 Yuga & Hindu units of time
 Vedic period & Vedic science
 Hinduism & Sanātana Dharma
 Sangam period & Sangam literature
 Greater India & Indosphere
 Sanskriti (disambiguation) & Sanskrit literature
 List of Hindu gurus and sants
 List of writers on Hinduism
 Indianization of Southeast Asia
 Hinduism in Southeast Asia
 Solar dynasty & Lunar dynasty
 Kuru Kingdom & Gandhara Kingdom
 Mughal-Rajput Wars
 Puranic chronology
 Puru and Yadu Dynasties
 Indus Valley Civilisation
 Janapadas & Mahajanapadas
 Middle kingdoms of India
 List of Indian monarchs
 Rajput resistance to Muslim conquests
 List of Jain states and dynasties
 List of Rajput dynasties and states
 Muslim conquests of Afghanistan

References 

Empires and Dynasties

Lists of dynasties